Fuxing Road station may refer to:

 Fuxing Road station (Hangzhou Metro), a station on the Hangzhou Metro in Hangzhou, Zhejiang.
 Fuxing Road station (Wuhan Metro), a station on the Wuhan Metro in Wuhan, Hubei.
 Fuxinglu station, a station on the Tianjin Metro.